Thomas Anthony Dettore, Jr. (born November 17, 1947 in Canonsburg, Pennsylvania) is a former Major League Baseball pitcher for the Pittsburgh Pirates and Chicago Cubs (–).

From –, Dettore was a pitching coach in the Pirates minor league system. He then became the Pirates minor league pitching coordinator. On January 13, he was named the pitching coach for the Double-A West Tenn Diamond Jaxx in the Seattle Mariners organization. After the 2009 season, he was named the pitching coach for the Class-A Advanced High Desert Mavericks of the California League.

References

External links
, or Retrosheet
Pura Pelota (Venezuelan Winter League)

1947 births
Living people
Águilas Cibaeñas players
American expatriate baseball players in the Dominican Republic
American people of Italian descent
Baseball players from Pennsylvania
Charleston Charlies players
Chicago Cubs players
Columbus Jets players
Florida Instructional League Pirates players
Gastonia Pirates players
Hawaii Islanders players
Juniata College alumni
Juniata Eagles baseball players
Major League Baseball pitchers
Navegantes del Magallanes players
American expatriate baseball players in Venezuela
New Orleans Pelicans (baseball) players
People from Canonsburg, Pennsylvania
Pittsburgh Pirates players
Waterbury Pirates players
Wichita Aeros players